Pterostylis laxa, commonly known as the antelope greenhood, is a species of orchid endemic to south-eastern Australia. As with similar greenhoods, the flowering plants differ from those which are not flowering. The non-flowering plants have a rosette of leaves flat on the ground but the flowering plants have a single flower with leaves on the flowering spike. This greenhood has green and white flowers with darker green or brown markings and a dorsal sepal with a long thread-like tip.

Description
The flowers are green and white with darker green or brown markings. The dorsal sepal and petals are fused, forming a hood or "galea" over the column. Flowering occurs from January to April.

Taxonomy and naming
Pterostylis laxa was first formally described in 1968 by John Blackmore from a specimen collected in the Upper Grose Valley. The description was published in The Orchadian. The specific epithet (laxa) is a Latin word meaning "loose" or "slack".

Distribution and habitat
The antelope greenhood grows among grasses on slopes in forest in north-eastern Victoria and in eastern New South Wales as far north as the Northern Tablelands.

References

laxa
Endemic orchids of Australia
Orchids of New South Wales
Orchids of the Australian Capital Territory
Orchids of Victoria (Australia)
Plants described in 1968